Shackleton is a 2002 British television miniseries. It was written and directed by Charles Sturridge and starring Kenneth Branagh as explorer Sir Ernest Shackleton. The film tells the true story of Shackleton's 1914 Antarctic expedition on the ship Endurance. The cast includes Kevin McNally, Lorcan Cranitch, Embeth Davidtz, Danny Webb, Matt Day and Phoebe Nicholls (also the director's wife) as Lady Shackleton. It was filmed in the UK, Iceland and Greenland. The film used first-hand accounts by the men on the expedition to retell the story. Shackleton biographer Roland Huntford was a production advisor.

Shackleton was first broadcast in two parts by Channel 4 in January 2002. In North America the film was first broadcast by the A&E Network in April 2002. The film was nominated for seven Emmy Awards,  six BAFTA Awards, and a Golden Globe Award.

Plot
The films tells the true story of explorer Sir Ernest Shackleton (Kenneth Branagh) and his 1914 Antarctic expedition on the ship Endurance. The story begins with him planning the expedition and finding sponsors, particularly Sir James Caird. Shackleton's goal is to drive dog sled teams from one side of Antarctica to the other, which would make Britain the first nation to undertake such a trans-continental journey.

Once the expedition is underway, trouble arises due to thick sea ice and low temperatures. Endurance becomes trapped and eventually crushed by pack ice. Shackleton vows to find a way to rescue the men. He undertakes an epic journey across the ice, followed by 800 miles of the Southern Ocean and then an uncharted mountain range on South Georgia Island. He finds a whaling station from which rescue parties are sent to collect his entire shipwrecked crew. The otherwise failed expedition is made famous for every crew member surviving despite insurmountable odds.

Cast
(In order of appearance)
 Kenneth Branagh as Sir Ernest Henry Shackleton
 John Grillo as Franks
 Phoebe Nicholls as Emily Shackleton
 Eve Best as Eleanor Shackleton
 Mark Tandy as Frank Shackleton
 Cicely Delaney as Cecily Shackleton
 Christian Young as Raymond Shackleton
 Embeth Davidtz as Rosalind Chetwynd
 Danny Webb as Perris
 Lorcan Cranitch as Frank Wild
 Michael Culkin as Jack Morgan
 Mark McGann as Tom Crean
 Abby Ford as Marcie
 Kevin McNally as Frank Worsley
 Robert Hardy as Sir James Caird
 Pip Torrens as James McIlroy
 Ken Drury as Harry McNish
 Matt Day as Frank Hurley

Awards and nominations

See also
Survival film

References

External links
 
 
 

2002 British television series debuts
2002 British television series endings
2000s British drama television series
British adventure television series
2000s British television miniseries
Channel 4 television dramas
Imperial Trans-Antarctic Expedition
English-language television shows
Films directed by Charles Sturridge
Television shows set in Antarctica
Films set in Antarctica
Ernest Shackleton